is a 1981 Japanese drama film directed by Kōhei Oguri. It was nominated for the Academy Award for Best Foreign Language Film. It was also entered into the 12th Moscow International Film Festival where it won the Silver Prize.

Plot
In the summer of 1956, Two boys, whose parents ply their trade by the mouth of a muddy river in Osaka, become close friends. The two families' "businesses" are in fact dining and prostitution. When Nobuo, the restaurateur's son, loses his pocket money during the Tenjin Festival, Kiichi, the prostitute's boy, invites him home, and he learns the truth.

Cast
 Takahiro Tamura as Shinpei Itakura
 Mariko Kaga as Shoko Matsumoto, Kiichi and Ginko's mother
 Nobutaka Asahara as Nobuo Itakura
 Makiko Shibata as Ginko Matsumoto
 Minoru Sakurai as Kiichi Matsumoto
 Yumiko Fujita as Sadako Itakura, Nobuo's mother
 Gannosuke Ashiya as Shinoda, the horse cart man

See also
 List of submissions to the 54th Academy Awards for Best Foreign Language Film
 List of Japanese submissions for the Academy Award for Best Foreign Language Film

References

External links

1981 films
1981 drama films
Japanese drama films
1980s Japanese-language films
Films directed by Kôhei Oguri
Best Film Kinema Junpo Award winners
1980s Japanese films